Jorge Molina Vidal (born 22 April 1982) is a Spanish professional footballer who plays as a centre-forward for Segunda División club Granada.

A late bloomer, he began to play professional football at 25 with Poli Ejido. He represented mainly Betis during his career, achieving two promotions to La Liga and scoring 77 goals in 213 matches across all competitions in the process. In the Spanish top division, he also represented Getafe and Granada.

Club career

Early years
Molina was born in Alcoy, Province of Alicante. Until the age of 23, he only played in the Tercera División, representing CD Alcoyano, Benidorm CF and CF Gandía. In 2005 he re-joined Benidorm, now in Segunda División B.

Molina made his professional debut in 2007–08, playing in Segunda División with Polideportivo Ejido. It would be a short-lived experience, as his five goals – squad-best, tied with three other players – in 30 matches, were not enough to prevent relegation. On 29 October 2008, he scored a hat-trick in a 5–0 home win against Villarreal CF in the round of 32 of the Copa del Rey (6–1 on aggregate).

In the summer of 2009, both Molina and teammate Juli signed with another side in the second division, Elche CF. His debut season was nothing short of spectacular, as he led the scoring charts with 26; on 19 June 2010, even though none of the teams left had anything to play for, he scored four times in the 4–1 home victory over champions Real Sociedad.

Betis
On 29 June 2010, Molina moved to Andalusia's Real Betis (also in the second tier) for €1.6 million, with the player signing a four-year contract; if his new club managed to promote at the end of the season, Elche were entitled to a €500,000 bonus. He scored 18 league goals in his first year (22 in all competitions), in spite of being sidelined for nearly three months with a knee injury. On 19 January 2011, in the domestic cup, he scored twice against FC Barcelona in a 3–1 home win (6–3 aggregate loss in the quarter-finals), thus ending the Catalans' unbeaten run of 28 games.

The attacking trio of Molina, Rubén Castro and midfielder Achille Emaná totalled more than 50 league goals in 2010–11, as Betis returned to La Liga after two years of absence. He made his debut in the competition at the age of 29, playing 30 minutes in a 1–0 away defeat of Granada CF. He scored his first goal on 15 October 2011, in a 4–1 loss to Real Madrid.

Molina and his team achieved another promotion at the end of the 2014–15 campaign, with him contributing 19 goals.

Getafe
On 24 June 2016, the 34-year-old Molina signed a two-year contract with Getafe CF on a free transfer. He scored 20 goals in his first year, ranking fourth in the individual charts to help his team return to the top flight.

On 31 August 2019, Molina scored in a 1–1 draw against Deportivo Alavés at the age of 37 years and 131 days, becoming the club's oldest player to achieve the feat in La Liga.

Granada
Molina agreed to a two-year deal with Granada on 25 August 2020. The following 29 April, he scored a header after coming on as a substitute against Barcelona, putting his team 2–1 ahead for their first ever win at the Camp Nou.

On 19 December 2021, Molina scored his first hat-trick in the Spanish top tier, helping the hosts beat RCD Mallorca 4–1 and becoming, at age 39, the oldest player to achieve this feat.

Career statistics

Honours
Betis
Segunda División: 2010–11, 2014–15

Individual
Pichichi Trophy (Segunda División): 2009–10

References

External links

1982 births
Living people
People from Alcoy
Sportspeople from the Province of Alicante
Spanish footballers
Footballers from the Valencian Community
Association football forwards
La Liga players
Segunda División players
Segunda División B players
Tercera División players
CD Alcoyano footballers
Benidorm CF footballers
CF Gandía players
Polideportivo Ejido footballers
Elche CF players
Real Betis players
Getafe CF footballers
Granada CF footballers